The 35th Moscow International Film Festival took place between 20 and 29 June 2013. World War Z was selected as the opening film. The Golden George was awarded to the Turkish film Particle.

Films in competition
The following films were selected for the main competition:

Jury
Competition
 Mohsen Makhmalbaf - Iranian film director
 Ursula Meier - Swiss film director
 Sergei Garmash - Russian actor
 Zurab Kipshidze - Georgian actor
 Kim Dong-ho - Korean actor

Awards
Competition
 Golden George: Particle by Erdem Tepegöz
 Special Jury Prize: The Ravine of Goodbye by Tatsushi Ōmori
 Silver George for Best Director: Young-heun Jung for Lebanon Emotion
 Silver George for Best Actor: Aleksey Shevchenkov for Judas
 Silver George for Best Actress: Jale Arıkan for Particle
 Special Prize for An Outstanding Contribution To The World Cinema: Costa-Gavras
 Stanislavsky Award: Kseniya Rappoport

References

External links
Moscow International Film Festival: 2013 at Internet Movie Database

2013
2013 film festivals
2013 festivals in Europe
Mos
2013 in Moscow
June 2013 events in Russia